Upper Arlington Lutheran Church (UALC) is an American multi-site Lutheran megachurch located in the northwestern Columbus suburbs of Upper Arlington and Hilliard, Ohio. It was founded in 1956 as a Lutheran mission by the former American Lutheran Church (now the Evangelical Lutheran Church in America). UALC is now associated in denomination with the North American Lutheran Church and Lutheran Congregations in Mission for Christ. The church has over 2000 members, and four weekend services averaging 1,200 attendees, making it one of the largest Lutheran churches in the United States.

Church organization
UALC's leadership is divided into three sections:
 Pastors and Lay Ministers
 Church Council
 Executive Staff

UALC has four Sunday worship services:
 Meets at Lytham Road Campus in Upper Arlington
 Traditional Service (9:00 am) & Modern Service (11:00 am)
 Meets at Mill Run Campus in Hilliard
UALC Worship (9:00 am & 11:00 am)

External links
  Upper Arlington Lutheran Church official website. 
  Upper Arlington Lutheran Church on Facebook.

Evangelical megachurches in the United States
Evangelical churches in Ohio
Churches in Columbus, Ohio
Christian organizations established in 1956
Multisite churches
Lutheran Congregations in Mission for Christ
North American Lutheran Church